The 2023 FA Women's League Cup Final was the twelfth final of the FA Women's League Cup, England's secondary cup competition for women's football teams and its primary league cup tournament. It took place on 5 March 2023 at Selhurst Park, and was contested by Chelsea and Arsenal.

Chelsea made their fourth consecutive (and fourth overall) appearance in a League Cup final, having lost the previous edition. Five-time winners Arsenal contested their ninth League Cup final and their first since losing in 2020. It was the second time the teams met in a League Cup final.

Arsenal won the match 3–1 and clinched their sixth title.

Route to the final

Chelsea 

Chelsea entered the competition in the quarter-finals due to their participation in the UEFA Women's Champions League.

The first of their two matches was a 3–1 win over Tottenham Hotspur. Chelsea took the lead seven minutes before half-time when Erin Cuthbert's shot was turned in by Sam Kerr from close range. Substitute Fran Kirby flicked in Chelsea's second after the break when she was teed up by Lauren James. Kerr made it 3–0 with a dinked finish late on, before Drew Spence claimed a consolation for Spurs.

Chelsea then went on to West Ham United, thrashing them 7–0 in the semi-final. They were 3–0 up after just 22 minutes, with a brace by Kerr and a goal by Kirby. In the stoppage time of the first half, Kerr netted her hat-trick. After James struck a fifth goal, Kerr was again left unmarked to net her fourth before Guro Reiten netted the Blues seventh with a deflected effort.

Arsenal 

Arsenal also entered the competition in the quarter-finals due to their participation in the UEFA Women's Champions League. They started off their journey by beating Aston Villa 3–0 in the quarter-final. Frida Maanum scored two goals and also provided an assist to Caitlin Foord.

The Gunners then took Manchester City to extra time in the semi-final. Stina Blackstenius pounced on fellow substitute Lina Hurtig's 93rd-minute cross, scoring the only goal of the game.

Match

References

External links 

FA Women's Super League Cup finals
2022–23 in English women's football
FA Women's League Cup Final
FA Women's League Cup Final
Chelsea F.C. Women matches
Arsenal W.F.C. matches